Lakshmi Gopalaswamy is an Indian actress from Karnataka and a classical dancer, qualified in Bharatanatyam. She has mainly acted in Malayalam films, while also appearing in few Tamil and Kannada films. She has also acted in several television serials.

She won the Karnataka State Film Award for Best Actress for her performance in her Kannada film Vidaya. Her debut Malayalam film Arayannangalude Veedu alongside Mammootty won her the Kerala State Film Award as the best supporting actor. She was a judge on Asianet's dance show Vodafone Thakadhimi..

Early life 
Lakshmi Gopalaswamy, was born in a Kannada family in Bangalore, Karnataka to M. K. Gopalaswamy and Dr. Uma Gopalaswamy. She has a younger brother, Arjun. Her Mother is a scholar of music who prompted Lakshmi to learn and pursue a career in Bharatanatyam.

Film career
She did her debut in the year 2000 with a Malayalam film Arayannangalude Veedu written and directed by Lohithadas alongside Mammootty which won her the Kerala State Film Award as the best supporting actress. In 2007, Lakshmi again received the Kerala State Film Award for the second best actress for her performances in Thaniye directed by debutant director Babu Thiruvalla and Paradesi directed by P. T. Kunju Mohammed. For the same films, she also received the "Atlas Film Critics Award" for the best woman actor.

In 2010, she secured a role in Aptharakshaka directed by P. Vasu, opposite South Indian star Vishnuvardhan. In this Kannada film, her performance as a dancer possessed by an evil spirit was praised by critics and the film-going public as well. The film went on to become a mega hit and ran for 35 continuous weeks in the theatres; and it was the last Kannada film of Vishnuvardhan. She also acted in Vishnuvardhan films like Vishnu Sena and Namyajamanru. Talking about the success of the film, Lakshmi in a recent interview said "I am satisfied with the kind of response I am getting from the audience for my performance in it. I had a desire to act with Vishnuji again and that is fulfilled with this movie." 

She acted in the Tamil serial titled Lakshmi and has won much praise.

Her success in Malayalam cinema also got her offers from her native Kannada film industry, too. Her debut Malayalam film Arayannangalude Veedu got her the Kerala State Award for the best supporting actress. Her second film, Kochu Kochu Santhosangal, also brought in much acclaim for her acting. Acting afforded her a different kind of exposure. "Initially I was intimidated by the profession, I was too shy to be famous," but she soon felt at home.

Dance

She says dance will always remain her favorite metier; she loves playing good roles in films, like those that integrate semi-classical dance tracks, like Kochu Kochu Santhoshangal, in which two classical dance numbers became popular in Kerala. Her star status in the film world notwithstanding, she dreams of metamorphosing into a top-notch dancer.

Awards
Kerala State Film Awards:
2000:Kerala State Film Award for Second Best Actress – Arayannangalude Veedu
2007: Kerala State Film Award for Second Best Actress – Thainye

Karnataka State Film Awards'
2014 : Karnataka State Film Award for Best Actress - Vidaaya

Filmfare Awards South
2007 : Best Supporting Actress – Paradeshi

Asianet Film Awards
 2001 - Best Female debut - Arayannangalude Veedu

Kerala Film Critic Awards 
 2007 : Best Actress - Thainye
 2016 : Special jury award - Kamboji

Jaihind TV Awards
2007 : Best Supporting Actress – Paradeshi & Thainye

Filmography

Television

She has been presenting her dance performances on different stages worldwide. She has appeared in many commercials especially in Malayalam.

Albums 
 Ormmayundo

Advertisements
 Alappat Jewellers
 Neutro Falcon Rice
 V Guard
 Apoorva
 MECT

References

External links

 

Kannada people
Indian female classical dancers
Bharatanatyam exponents
Performers of Indian classical dance
Kerala State Film Award winners
Artists from Bangalore
Actresses in Malayalam cinema
Living people
21st-century Indian actresses
Actresses in Kannada cinema
Indian film actresses
Filmfare Awards South winners
Actresses in Tamil cinema
Actresses in Hindi cinema
Actresses from Bangalore
Dancers from Karnataka
20th-century Indian dancers
21st-century Indian dancers
Indian television actresses
Actresses in Malayalam television
Actresses in Tamil television
Actresses in Telugu television
Women artists from Karnataka
20th-century Indian women
Year of birth missing (living people)